Modernist film is related to the art and philosophy of modernism.

History
Early modernist film came to maturity in the era between WWI and WWII, with characteristics such as montage and symbolic imagery, manifesting itself in genres as diverse as expressionism and surrealism (as featured in the works of Fritz Lang and Luis Buñuel) while postmodernist film – similar to postmodernism as a whole – is a reaction to modernist works, and to their tendencies (such as nostalgia and angst). Modernist cinema has been said to have "explored and exposed the formal concerns of the medium by placing them at the forefront of consciousness." The auteur theory and idea of an author creating a work from their singular vision became a central characteristic of modernist filmmaking. It has been said that "To investigate the transparency of the image is modernist but to undermine its reference to reality is to engage with the aesthetics of postmodernism." The modernist film has more faith in the author, the individual, and the accessibility of reality itself (and generally has a more sincere tone) than the postmodernist film.

List of notable modernist films

A Story of Floating Weeds (1934)
Day for Night (1973; also called a postmodernist film)
Hiroshima mon amour (1959; also been called a postmodernist film)
A Matter of Life and Death (1946)
The Girl Can't Help It (1956)
Symbiopsychotaxiplasm: Take One (1968)
Lonesome Lenny (1946)
Black Panthers (1968)
The Murder of Fred Hampton (1971)
Singin in the Rain (1951)
Persona (1966; also called a postmodernist film)
Allures (1961)
In the Year of the Pig (1969)
Thugs with Dirty Mugs (1939)
Zabriskie Point (1970)
Daffy Duck and Egghead (1938)
The Heckling Hare (1941)
Now Hear This (1962)
Breakaway (1966)
Medium Cool (1968)
Gimme Shelter (1970)
Monterey Pop (1968)
Punishment Park (1971)
The Holy Mountain (1973; also been called a postmodernist film)
W.R.: Mysteries of the Organism (1971)
Sunset Boulevard (1950)
Rashomon (1950)
Son of Paleface (1952)
L'Avventura (1960; also been called a postmodernist film)
Un Chien Andalou (1929)
Battleship Potemkin (1925)
The Fall of the House of Usher (1928)
Magical Maestro (1952)
L'age d'Or (1930)
Detour (1945)
Shock Corridor (1963)
Experiment in Terror (1962)
Leave Her to Heaven (1945)
The Lodger (1927)
Out of the Past (1947)
Artists & Models (1955)
Accident (1967)
Gilda (1946)
The Passion of Joan of Arc (1928)
Sunrise (1927)
Pierrot Le Fou (1965, also been called a postmodernist film)
The Killers (1946)
The Great Dictator (1940)
The Hand (1965)
Ballet Mecanique (1923)
Duck Amuck (1953; also been called a postmodernist film)
The Color of Pomegranates (1969; also been called a postmodernist film) 
Report (1967)
Man with a Movie Camera (1929) 
The Cabinet of Dr. Caligari (1920)
Cat People (1942)
Last Year at Marienbad (1961; also been called a postmodernist film)
Meshes of the Afternoon (1943)
Rome Open City (1945)
The Crowd (1928)
The Apu trilogy (1955-1959)
Metropolis (1927)
Vertigo (1958)
Citizen Kane (1941)
The Last Laugh (1924)
Berlin: Symphony of a City (1927)
Breathless (1960)
Andrei Rublev (1966)
Blowup (1966; also been called a postmodernist film)
La Strada (1954)
All That Heaven Allows (1955; also been called a postmodernist film)
The Bicycle Thieves (1949)
Gerald McBoing Boing (1950)
The Boy with Green Hair (1948)
Mr. Klein (1976)
Wild Strawberries (1957)
The Seventh Seal (1956)
Kiss Me Deadly (1955)
The Asphalt Jungle (1950)
The Naked City (1948)
Double Indemnity (1944) 
Two Happy Hearts (1932)
Manhatta (1921)
The Life of Emile Zola (1937)
A Woman Under the Influence (1974)
Confessions of a Nazi Spy (1939)
Jeanne Dielman, 23 quai du Commerce, 1080 Bruxelles (1975)
8½ (1963; also been called a postmodernist film)
The Mirror (1975)
Au Hasard Balthazar (1966)
Apple in the River (1974)
Dead Mountaineer's Hotel (1979)
Rebel Without a Cause (1955)
La dolce vita (1960)
Magnificent Obsession (1954)
Two Weeks in Another Town (1962)
The 400 Blows (1959)
The Loneliness of the Long Distance Runner (1961)
Play Time (1967; also been called a postmodernist film)
Stagecoach (1939)
The Third Man (1949)
Rebecca (1940)
Marnie (1964)
Olympia (1938)
Intolerance (1916)
Cabiria (1914)
2001: A Space Odyssey (1968; also been called a postmodernist film)
Dracula (1931)
Frankenstein (1931)
Time Piece (1965)
The Pop Show (1966)
N.Y., N.Y. (1957)
Here Is Your Life (1966)
My Name Is Oona (1969)
Mass for the Dakota Sioux (1964)
God Respects Us When We Work, But Loves Us When We Dance (1968)
Arabesque (1975)
Will Success Spoil Rock Hunter? (1957)
Screwball Squirrel (1944)
Who Killed Who (1943)
Voyage to Italy (1954)
Diary (1974)

List of notable modernist filmmakers

Chantal Ackerman
Agnes Varda (also been called a postmodernist filmmaker)
Roberto Rossellini
Shirley Clarke
Ida Lupino
Yasujiro Ozu
Satyajit Ray
Maya Deren
William Greaves
Sam Fuller
Alain Renais (also been called a postmodernist filmmaker)
Robert Aldrich
Nicholas Ray
Douglas Sirk (also been called a postmodernist filmmaker)
Luis Bunuel
Orson Welles
Alfred Hitchcock
Andrei Tarkovsky
Akira Kurosawa
Robert Bresson
Federico Fellini (also been called a postmodernist filmmaker)
Ingmar Bergman (also been called a postmodernist filmmaker)
Jules Dassin
Jean-Luc Godard (also been called a postmodernist filmmaker)
Stan Brakhage
Fritz Lang
Norman McLaren
Carl Theodore Dreyer
Len Lye
Oscar Micheaux
Jacques Tourneur
François Truffaut (also been called a postmodernist filmmaker)
Tony Richardson 
John Ford
Tex Avery (also been called a postmodernist filmmaker)
John and Faith Hubley
Joseph Losey
Jacques Tati (also been called a postmodernist filmmaker)
John Cassavetes (also been called a postmodernist filmmaker)
Blake Edwards
Rainer Werner Fassbinder
Michelangelo Antonioni (also been called a postmodernist filmmaker)
Vincente Minnelli
Dziga Vertov
Bruce Conner (also been called a postmodernist filmmaker)
Stanley Kubrick (also been called a postmodernist filmmaker)
Emile de Antonio
Jordan Belson
Chris Marker (also been called a postmodernist filmmaker)
John Whitney
William Klein
Frank Tashlin
Chuck Jones (also been called a postmodernist filmmaker)
Jiri Trnka
Edward D. Wood Jr.
Sources:

See also
Minimalist film
Maximalist film
European art cinema
Film noir
Classical Hollywood cinema
Melodrama
Arthouse animation
B movie
Art film
Vulgar auteurism
World cinema
Golden age of American animation
Independent animation
Limited animation
A Personal Journey with Martin Scorsese Through American Movies

References

External links
Theories of Modernism and Cinema
Cinema and modernism - The British Library
Post-war Cinema and Modernity

Modernism
Film genres
Visual arts
1910s in film
1920s in film
1930s in film
1940s in film
1950s in film
1960s in film
1970s in film
Modern art
Social realism
1930s in animation
1940s in animation
1950s in animation
1960s in animation
1970s in animation
Aesthetics
Concepts in aesthetics